The Civil War in Afghanistan (1978–present), also known as the Afghan Civil War and several other names, was a civil war in Afghanistan. The civil war started when the Communist Party of Afghanistan took all political power in Afghanistan on 27 April 1978. This event led indirectly to the Soviet military intervention in Afghanistan.

Government Armies and allies

Soviet Union 
 Sergei Sokolov Valentin Varennikov Boris Gromov

Afghanistan 
 Babrak Karmal (PDPA) Mohammad Najibullah (PDPA) Abdul Rashid Dostum (PDPA) Burhanuddin Rabbani (Islamic State) Ahmed Shah Massoud † (Islamic State) Mohammed Fahim (Islamic State) Bismillah Khan (Islamic Republic)

NATO forces 
 Tommy Franks (CENTCOM) John P. Abizaid (CENTCOM) William J. Fallon (CENTCOM) Martin Dempsey (CENTCOM) David Petraeus (CENTCOM) David Richards (ISAF) Dan McNeill (ISAF) Mauro del Vecchio (ISAF)
 David D. McKiernan (ISAF) Egon Ramms (NATO)

Rebels and terrorists

Al-Qaeda 
 Osama bin Laden Ayman al-Zawahiri Mustafa Abu al-Yazid

Jihad rebels 
 Ahmad Shah Massoud  Abdul Haq Ismail Khan Gulbuddin Hekmatyar Jalaluddin Haqqani Abdullah AzzamJalaluddin Haqqani Tohir Yo‘ldosh Gulbuddin Hekmatyar Sirajuddin Haqqani Baitullah Mehsud

Taliban 
 Mohammed Omar Obaidullah Akhund Mullah Dadullah Mullah Bakht Mohammed Jalaluddin Haqqani

External links 
 Backgrounder on Afghanistan: History of the War October 2001
 Ending Afghanistan’s Civil by James Dobbins, The RAND Corporation, Testimony presented before the House Armed Services Committee on January 30, 2007
 Fueling Afghanistan's War-Press Backgrounder

People of the Afghanistan conflict (1978–present)
Military leadership